MitoMap is a real time haplotyping protocol that analyzes pathogenic variants that cause several mitochondrial diseases.  It was carried out real-time for the first time during the 2013 NexGen Genomics & Bioinformatics Technologies conference at Delhi, India from November 14–16. The results have been published online.

References 

2013 introductions
Bioinformatics